"Don't You Know That?" is a song by American recording artist Luther Vandross. The song was released as the second single in support of the album Never Too Much.

The single followed Vandross's #1 R&B hit, "Never Too Much". In January 1982, Vandross scored his second top ten R&B hit when "Don't You Know That? peaked to No. 10 on the Billboard Hot R&B Singles.

This song is sampled by Black Sheep on "To Whom It May Concern" on their 1991 album A Wolf in Sheep's Clothing, and by Heavy D on "Got Me Waiting" on his 1994 album Nuttin' But Love.

The song was also sampled by 112 on the track "Love Me" featuring Mase on their 1998 studio album Room 112.

The song was covered by Rashaan Patterson in 2019 from his album Heroes & Gods.

Charts

References

1981 songs
Luther Vandross songs
1981 singles
Songs written by Luther Vandross
Epic Records singles